Enoch is a biblical figure and the subject of the Book of Enoch.

Enoch may also refer to:

People
 Enoch (given name)
 Enoch (surname)
 Enoch (son of Cain)
 Enoch, one of the five sons of Midian
 Teneu, also known as St. Enoch

Places

Canada
Enoch, Alberta, postal address of Enoch Cree Nation 135

United States
Enoch, Kentucky
 Enoch, Utah
Enoch, West Virginia
 Enoch Lake, a small community near Lake Park, Georgia
 Enoch, Texas, an unincorporated community in Upshur County, Texas

Entertainment
 "Enoch", a short story from the Pleasant Dreams: Nightmares by Robert Bloch
 Enoch, a band later renamed P.O.D. (Payable on Death)
 Enoch, a fictional city of vampires in World of Darkness

See also
 
 
 Book of Enoch (disambiguation)
 Enochian (disambiguation)
 Enoc (disambiguation)
 Chanoch (disambiguation)
 Hanoch (disambiguation)
 Henoch (disambiguation)